Chernevo is a rural locality (a village) in Styopantsevskoye Rural Settlement, Vyaznikovsky District, Vladimir Oblast, Russia. The population was 22 as of 2010.

Geography 
Chernevo is located 50 km southwest of Vyazniki (the district's administrative centre) by road. Butorlino is the nearest rural locality.

References 

Rural localities in Vyaznikovsky District